Democratic Republic of the Congo–United States relations are the international relations between the Democratic Republic of the Congo and the United States of America.

Overview

The dominant position in Central Africa makes stability in the DRC an important element of overall stability in the region.  In December 2006, the DRC inaugurated its first democratically elected president in over 40 years, the culmination of the Congolese people's efforts to choose their leaders through a peaceful, democratic process.  The United States played a role in the peace process in the DRC.

When the DRC was known as Zaire, it had a strong alliance with the United States. This was in part because Zairian leader Mobutu Sese Seko was considered to be a strong anti-communist, and the United States government saw Zaire as a useful stability buffer to prevent the spread of Marxism in Africa. Mobutu himself was friendly with most of the U.S. Presidents during his presidency, and was also able to get a lot of foreign aid from the U.S. and the west. Zaire also found itself on the same side as the United States and South Africa fighting Cuban and Soviet backed revolutionaries during the Angolan Civil War. After the fall of the Soviet Union in 1991 however, relations weakened significantly, and with socialism being less of a threat to western interests in Africa, the United States government saw less of a need to prop up Mobutu's regime, that was also accused of human rights violations. This ultimately led to Zaire's collapse as Mobutu was not prepared for his regime's fate in the First Congo War. Not long after regime change, Zaire became known as the Democratic Republic of the Congo.

The United States remains a partner with the DRC and other central African nations in their quest for stability and growth on the continent, and facilitated the signing of a tripartite agreement on regional security in the Great Lakes region between the DRC, Rwanda, and Uganda in October 2004. Burundi formally joined the Tripartite Commission in September 2005, and the Tripartite Commission is now Tripartite Plus. The United States also supported UN efforts to create a Joint Verification Mechanism to monitor the border between the DRC and Rwanda. From the start of the Congo crisis, the United States has pursued an active diplomatic strategy in support of these objectives.  In the long term, the United States seeks to strengthen the process of internal reconciliation and democratization within all the states of the region to promote stable, developing, and democratic nations with which it can work to address security interests on the continent and develop mutually beneficial economic relations.

The United States appointed its current ambassador to the DRC in 2018. The DRC appointed its current ambassador to the United States in 2000. The DRC has been on the State Department's travel advisory list since 1977.

Principal U.S. Officials
 Ambassador— Michael A. Hammer
 Deputy Chief of Mission—Marion Ekpuk

Diplomatic missions

The U.S. Embassy is located in Kinshasa.

References

Further reading
 Beebe, Craig. "Congolese Americans." Gale Encyclopedia of Multicultural America, edited by Thomas Riggs, (3rd ed., vol. 1, Gale, 2014), pp. 531–541. online

External links
 History of Democratic Republic of the Congo - U.S. relations

 
United States
Congo, Democratic Republic